is a Japanese footballer who plays as a midfielder for J2 League club Blaublitz Akita.

Club statistics
Updated to 3 December 2022.

Honours
 Blaublitz Akita
 J3 League (1): 2020

References

External links
Profile at Sapporo
Profile at Nagano Parceiro
Profile at Akita
Profile at Kataller Toyama 

1992 births
Living people
Association football people from Hokkaido
Japanese footballers
J1 League players
J2 League players
J3 League players
Hokkaido Consadole Sapporo players
Kataller Toyama players
AC Nagano Parceiro players
Association football forwards
Sportspeople from Sapporo